This is an incomplete list of Statutory Rules of Northern Ireland in 2004.

1-100

 Police (Recruitment) (Northern Ireland) (Amendment) Regulations 2004 (S.R. 2004 No. 1)
 Police Reserve Trainee Regulations (Northern Ireland) 2004 (S.R. 2004 No. 2)
 Police Service of Northern Ireland Reserve (Part-Time) Regulations 2004 (S.R. 2004 No. 3)
 Prison and Young Offenders Centre (Amendment) Rules (Northern Ireland) 2004 (S.R. 2004 No. 4)
 Dismissal Procedures Agreement Designation 1981 (Revocation) Order (Northern Ireland) 2004 (S.R. 2004 No. 6)
 Collagen and Gelatine (Intra-Community Trade) Regulations (Northern Ireland) 2004 (S.R. 2004 No. 7)
 Housing Renewal Grants (Reduction of Grant) Regulations (Northern Ireland) 2004 (S.R. 2004 No. 8)
 Meat Products Regulations (Northern Ireland) 2004 (S.R. 2004 No. 13)
 Social Security (Child Maintenance Premium) (Amendment) Regulations (Northern Ireland) 2004 (S.R. 2004 No. 16)
 Social Security (Hospital In-Patients) (Amendment) Regulations (Northern Ireland) 2004 (S.R. 2004 No. 18)
 Taxis (Newtownards) (Amendment) Bye-Laws (Northern Ireland) 2004 (S.R. 2004 No. 19)
 Salaries (Comptroller and Auditor General) Order (Northern Ireland) 2004 (S.R. 2004 No. 20)
 Companies (Investment Companies) (Distribution of Profits) Regulations (Northern Ireland) 2004 (S.R. 2004 No. 22)
 Unsolicited Goods and Services (Electronic Communications) Order (Northern Ireland) 2004 (S.R. 2004 No. 23)
 Rates (Regional Rates) Order (Northern Ireland) 2004 (S.R. 2004 No. 24)
 Taxis (Warrenpoint) Bye-Laws (Northern Ireland) 2004 (S.R. 2004 No. 25)
 Food (Hot Chilli and Hot Chilli Products) (Emergency Control) (Amendment) Regulations (Northern Ireland) 2004 (S.R. 2004 No. 26)
 Superannuation (Economic Research Institute of Northern Ireland Limited) Order (Northern Ireland) 2004 (S.R. 2004 No. 27)
 Superannuation (Office of the Commissioner for Children and Young People for Northern Ireland) Order (Northern Ireland) 2004 (S.R. 2004 No. 28)
 Superannuation (Civilian Direct Recruits to the Police Service of Northern Ireland) Order (Northern Ireland) 2004 (S.R. 2004 No. 29)
 Motor Vehicles (Approval) (Amendment) Regulations (Northern Ireland) 2004 (S.R. 2004 No. 30)
 Police Service of Northern Ireland Pensions (Additional Voluntary Contributions) (Amendment) Regulations 2004 (S.R. 2004 No. 31)
 Novel Foods and Novel Food Ingredients Regulations (Northern Ireland) 2004 (S.R. 2004 No. 33)
 Motorways Traffic (Amendment) Regulations (Northern Ireland) 2004 (S.R. 2004 No. 34)
 Waste Incineration (Amendment) Regulations (Northern Ireland) 2004 (S.R. 2004 No. 35)
 Solvent Emissions Regulations (Northern Ireland) 2004 (S.R. 2004 No. 36)
 Regulation and Improvement Authority (Appointments and Procedure) Regulations (Northern Ireland) 2004 (S.R. 2004 No. 37)
 General Teaching Council for Northern Ireland (Registration of Teachers) Regulations (Northern Ireland) 2004 (S.R. 2004 No. 38)
 Registered Rents (Increase) Order (Northern Ireland) 2004 (S.R. 2004 No. 42)
 Motor Vehicles (Construction and Use) (Amendment) Regulations (Northern Ireland) 2004 (S.R. 2004 No. 44)
 Social Security (Miscellaneous Amendments) Regulations (Northern Ireland) 2004 (S.R. 2004 No. 45)
 Housing Benefit (State Pension Credit and Miscellaneous Amendments) Regulations (Northern Ireland) 2004 (S.R. 2004 No. 46)
 Housing Benefit (Miscellaneous Amendments) Regulations (Northern Ireland) 2004 (S.R. 2004 No. 47)
 Motor Vehicles (Construction and Use) (Amendment No. 2) Regulations (Northern Ireland) 2004 (S.R. 2004 No. 48)
 Local Government (Constituting a Joint Committee a Body Corporate) Order (Northern Ireland) 2004 (S.R. 2004 No. 49)
 Disability Discrimination Code of Practice (Goods, Facilities, Services and Premises) (Appointed Day) Order (Northern Ireland) 2004 (S.R. 2004 No. 50)
 Disability Discrimination Act 1995 (Amendment) Regulations (Northern Ireland) 2004 (S.R. 2004 No. 55)
 Northern Ireland Social Care Council (Description of social care workers) Order (Northern Ireland) 2004 (S.R. 2004 No. 56)
 Northern Ireland Social Care Council (Description of persons to be treated as social care workers) Regulations (Northern Ireland) 2004 (S.R. 2004 No. 57)
 Dairy Produce Quotas (Amendment) Regulations (Northern Ireland) 2004 (S.R. 2004 No. 59)
 Occupational Pension Schemes (Winding Up and Deficiency on Winding Up, etc.) (Amendment) Regulations (Northern Ireland) 2004 (S.R. 2004 No. 60)
 Emergency Grants (Eligible Tenants) Order (Northern Ireland) 2004 (S.R. 2004 No. 61)
 Northern Ireland Medical and Dental Training Agency (Establishment and Constitution) Order (Northern Ireland) 2004 (S.R. 2004 No. 62)
 Gas Safety (Installation and Use) Regulations (Northern Ireland) 2004 (S.R. 2004 No. 63)
 Employment Rights (Increase of Limits) Order (Northern Ireland) 2004 (S.R. 2004 No. 64)
 Motor Vehicles (Approval) (Fees) Regulations (Northern Ireland) 2004 (S.R. 2004 No. 65)
 Motor Vehicles (Construction and Use) (Amendment No. 3) Regulations (Northern Ireland) 2004 (S.R. 2004 No. 67)
 Administration of Estates (Small Payments) (Increase of Limit) Order (Northern Ireland) 2004 (S.R. 2004 No. 68)
 Seed Potatoes Marketing Board Assets (Revocation) Order (Northern Ireland) 2004 (S.R. 2004 No. 69)
 Seed Potatoes (Levy) (Amendment) Order (Northern Ireland) 2004 (S.R. 2004 No. 70)
 Energy (2003 Order) (Commencement No. 2) Order (Northern Ireland) 2004 (S.R. 2004 No. 71)
 Income Support (General) (Standard Interest Rate Amendment) Regulations (Northern Ireland) 2004 (S.R. 2004 No. 72)
 Litter (Fixed Penalty) Order (Northern Ireland) 2004 (S.R. 2004 No. 73)
 Fisheries (Amendment) Byelaws (Northern Ireland) 2004 (S.R. 2004 No. 74)
 Foyle Area and Carlingford Area (Angling) (Amendment) Regulations 2004 (S.R. 2004 No. 75)
 Marketing and Use of Dangerous Substances Regulations (Northern Ireland) 2004 (S.R. 2004 No. 76)
 Pharmacy (Northern Ireland) Order 1976 (Amendment) Order (Northern Ireland) 2004 (S.R. 2004 No. 78)
 Guaranteed Minimum Pensions Increase Order (Northern Ireland) 2004 (S.R. 2004 No. 79)
 Social Security Pensions (Low Earnings Threshold) Order (Northern Ireland) 2004 (S.R. 2004 No. 80)
 Social Security Revaluation of Earnings Factors Order (Northern Ireland) 2004 (S.R. 2004 No. 81)
 Social Security Benefits Up-rating Order (Northern Ireland) 2004 (S.R. 2004 No. 82)
 Social Security Benefits Up-rating Regulations (Northern Ireland) 2004 (S.R. 2004 No. 83)
 Social Security (Industrial Injuries) (Dependency) (Permitted Earnings Limits) Order (Northern Ireland) 2004 (S.R. 2004 No. 84)
 Social Security (Claims and Payments) (Amendment) Regulations (Northern Ireland) 2004 (S.R. 2004 No. 85)
 Legal Aid (Financial Conditions) Regulations (Northern Ireland) 2004 (S.R. 2004 No. 86)
 Legal Advice and Assistance (Amendment) Regulations (Northern Ireland) 2004 (S.R. 2004 No. 87)
 Legal Advice and Assistance (Financial Conditions) Regulations (Northern Ireland) 2004 (S.R. 2004 No. 88)
 Road Traffic (Health Services Charges) (Amendment) Regulations (Northern Ireland) 2004 (S.R. 2004 No. 89)
 Travelling Expenses and Remission of Charges Regulations (Northern Ireland) 2004 (S.R. 2004 No. 91)
 Optical Charges and Payments and General Ophthalmic Services (Amendment) Regulations (Northern Ireland) 2004 (S.R. 2004 No. 92)
 Dental Charges (Amendment) Regulations (Northern Ireland) 2004 (S.R. 2004 No. 93)
 Charges for Drugs and Appliances (Amendment) Regulations (Northern Ireland) 2004 (S.R. 2004 No. 94)
 Food Safety (Ships and Aircraft) Order (Northern Ireland) 2004 (S.R. 2004 No. 99)
 Eel Fishing (Licence Duties) Regulations (Northern Ireland) 2004 (S.R. 2004 No. 100)

101-200

 Workmen's Compensation (Supplementation) (Amendment) Regulations (Northern Ireland) 2004 (S.R. 2004 No. 101)
 Planning (Fees) (Amendment) Regulations (Northern Ireland) 2004 (S.R. 2004 No. 102)
 Health and Personal Social Services (Superannuation) (Amendment) Regulations (Northern Ireland) 2004 (S.R. 2004 No. 103)
 Health and Personal Social Services (Superannuation Scheme and Additional Voluntary Contributions) (Pension Sharing) (Amendment) Regulations (Northern Ireland) 2004 (S.R. 2004 No. 104)
 Food for Particular Nutritional Uses (Addition of Substances for Specific Nutritional Purposes) (Amendment) Regulations (Northern Ireland) 2004 (S.R. 2004 No. 105)
 Producer Responsibility Obligations (Packaging Waste) (Amendment) Regulations (Northern Ireland) 2004 (S.R. 2004 No. 106)
 Health and Personal Social Services (2001 Act) (Commencement No. 6) Order (Northern Ireland) 2004 (S.R. 2004 No. 107)
 Rules of the Supreme Court (Northern Ireland) (Amendment) 2004 (S.R. 2004 No. 108)
 Fisheries and Aquaculture Structures (Grants) (Amendment) Regulations (Northern Ireland) 2004 (S.R. 2004 No. 109)
 State Pension Credit (Miscellaneous Amendments) Regulations (Northern Ireland) 2004 (S.R. 2004 No. 110)
 Statutory Paternity Pay and Statutory Adoption Pay (Weekly Rates) (Amendment) Regulations (Northern Ireland) 2004 (S.R. 2004 No. 111)
 Optical Charges and Payments and General Ophthalmic Services (Amendment No. 2) Regulations (Northern Ireland) 2004 (S.R. 2004 No. 113)
 Police (Northern Ireland) Act 2000 (Renewal of Temporary Provisions) Order 2004 (S.R. 2004 No. 114)
 Natural Mineral Water, Spring Water and Bottled Drinking Water (Amendment) Regulations (Northern Ireland) 2004 (S.R. 2004 No. 115)
 Paternity and Adoption Leave (Amendment) Regulations (Northern Ireland) 2004 (S.R. 2004 No. 116)
 Pensions Increase (Review) Order (Northern Ireland) 2004 (S.R. 2004 No. 118)
 Carers and Direct Payments (2002 Act) (Commencement No. 2) Order (Northern Ireland) 2004 (S.R. 2004 No. 119)
 Personal Social Services and Children's Services (Direct Payments) Regulations (Northern Ireland) 2004 (S.R. 2004 No. 120)
 Health and Personal Social Services (Assessment of Resources) (Amendment) Regulations (Northern Ireland) 2004 (S.R. 2004 No. 121)
 Police Service of Northern Ireland (Secondment) (Garda Síochána) Regulations 2004 (S.R. 2004 No. 122)
 Primary Medical Services (2004 Order) (Commencement) Order (Northern Ireland) 2004 (S.R. 2004 No. 123)
 Pneumoconiosis, etc., (Workers' Compensation) (Payment of Claims) (Amendment) Regulations (Northern Ireland) 2004 (S.R. 2004 No. 124)
 Marketing and Use of Dangerous Substances (No. 2) Regulations (Northern Ireland) 2004 (S.R. 2004 No. 125)
 Plant Protection Products Regulations (Northern Ireland) 2004 (S.R. 2004 No. 126)
 Statutory Paternity Pay and Statutory Adoption Pay (Amendment) Regulations (Northern Ireland) 2004 (S.R. 2004 No. 132)
 Health Services (Primary Care) (1997 Order) (Commencement No. 4) Order (Northern Ireland) 2004 (S.R. 2004 No. 133)
 Local Government Pension Scheme (Amendment) Regulations (Northern Ireland) 2004 (S.R. 2004 No. 139)
 Health and Personal Social Services (General Medical Services Contracts) Regulations (Northern Ireland) 2004 (S.R. 2004 No. 140)
 General Medical Services Transitional and Consequential Provisions (No. 1) (Northern Ireland) Order 2004 (S.R. 2004 No. 141)
 Health and Personal Social Services (General Medical Services Contracts) (Prescription of Drugs Etc.) Regulations (Northern Ireland) 2004 (S.R. 2004 No. 142)
 Social Security (Miscellaneous Amendments No. 2) Regulations (Northern Ireland) 2004 (S.R. 2004 No. 143)
 Housing Benefit (Abolition of Benefit Periods Amendment) Regulations (Northern Ireland) 2004 (S.R. 2004 No. 144)
 Housing Benefit (Extended Payments (Severe Disablement Allowance and Incapacity Benefit) Amendment) Regulations (Northern Ireland) 2004 (S.R. 2004 No. 145)
 Breeding Flocks, Hatcheries and Animal By-Products (Fees) Order (Northern Ireland) 2004 (S.R. 2004 No. 146)
 Rates (Amendment) (2004 Order) (Commencement) Order (Northern Ireland) 2004 (S.R. 2004 No. 147)
 Taxis (Ballynahinch) Bye-Laws (Northern Ireland) 2004 (S.R. 2004 No. 148)
 Health and Personal Social Services (Primary Medical Services Performers Lists) Regulations (Northern Ireland) 2004 (S.R. 2004 No. 149)
 Employment (Northern Ireland) Order 2003 (Commencement and Transitional Provisions) Order (Northern Ireland) 2004 (S.R. 2004 No. 150)
 Non-IACS Farm Support (Review of Decisions) Regulations (Northern Ireland) 2004 (S.R. 2004 No. 151)
 Houses In Multiple Occupation (Registration Scheme Fees) Order (Northern Ireland) 2004 (S.R. 2004 No. 152)
 Non-Domestic Rating (Unoccupied Property) Regulations (Northern Ireland) 2004 (S.R. 2004 No. 153)
 Medicated Feedingstuffs (Amendment) Regulations (Northern Ireland) 2004 (S.R. 2004 No. 154)
 Feedingstuffs (Zootechnical Products) (Amendment) Regulations (Northern Ireland) 2004 (S.R. 2004 No. 155)
 General Medical Services Transitional and Consequential Provisions (No. 2) (Northern Ireland) Order 2004 (S.R. 2004 No. 156)
 Industrial Tribunals (Increase of Maximum Deposit) Order (Northern Ireland) 2004 (S.R. 2004 No. 157)
 Fair Employment Tribunal (Increase of Maximum Deposit) Order (Northern Ireland) 2004 (S.R. 2004 No. 158)
 The Welfare Foods (Amendment) Regulations (Northern Ireland) 2004 (S.R. 2004 No. 161)
 Travelling Expenses and Remission of Charges and Optical Charges and Payments and General Ophthalmic Services (Amendment) Regulations (Northern Ireland) 2004 (S.R. 2004 No. 162)
 Social Security (Income-Related Benefits Self-Employment Route Amendment) Regulations (Northern Ireland) 2004 (S.R. 2004 No. 163)
 Fair Employment Tribunal (Rules of Procedure) Regulations (Northern Ireland) 2004 (S.R. 2004 No. 164)
 Industrial Tribunals (Constitution and Rules of Procedure) Regulations (Northern Ireland) 2004 (S.R. 2004 No. 165)
 Jobseeker's Allowance (Amendment) Regulations (Northern Ireland) 2004 (S.R. 2004 No. 166)
 Legal Aid (Assessment of Resources) (Amendment) Regulations (Northern Ireland) 2004 (S.R. 2004 No. 167)
 Legal Advice and Assistance (Amendment No. 2) Regulations (Northern Ireland) 2004 (S.R. 2004 No. 168)
 Legal Advice and Assistance (Amendment No. 3) Regulations (Northern Ireland) 2004 (S.R. 2004 No. 169)
 Equal Pay Act 1970 (Amendment) Regulations (Northern Ireland) 2004 (S.R. 2004 No. 171)
 Sex Discrimination Order 1976 (Amendment) Regulations (Northern Ireland) 2004 (S.R. 2004 No. 172)
 Sea Fishing (Restriction on Days at Sea) Order (Northern Ireland) 2004 (S.R. 2004 No. 173)
 Motor Cars (Driving Instruction) Regulations (Northern Ireland) 2004 (S.R. 2004 No. 179)
 Legal Advice and Assistance (Amendment No. 4) Regulations (Northern Ireland) 2004 (S.R. 2004 No. 180)
 Seed Potatoes (Crop Fees) Regulations (Northern Ireland) 2004 (S.R. 2004 No. 181)
 Food (Jelly Confectionery) (Emergency Control) (Amendment) Regulations (Northern Ireland) 2004 (S.R. 2004 No. 182)
 Potatoes Originating in Egypt Regulations (Northern Ireland) 2004 (S.R. 2004 No. 183)
 Occupational Pension Schemes (Winding Up) (Amendment) Regulations (Northern Ireland) 2004 (S.R. 2004 No. 187)
 Optical Charges and Payments (Amendment) Regulations (Northern Ireland) 2004 (S.R. 2004 No. 188)
 Weighing Equipment (Filling and Discontinuous Totalising Automatic Weighing Machines) (Amendment) Regulations (Northern Ireland) 2004 (S.R. 2004 No. 189)
 Companies (1986 Order) (Accounts of Small and Medium-Sized Enterprises and Audit Exemption) (Amendment) Regulations (Northern Ireland) 2004 (S.R. 2004 No. 190)
 Non-Domestic Rating (Unoccupied Property) (Prescribed Information) Regulations (Northern Ireland) 2004 (S.R. 2004 No. 191)
 Rent Book Regulations (Northern Ireland) 2004 (S.R. 2004 No. 192)
 Lands Tribunal (Salaries) Order (Northern Ireland) 2004 (S.R. 2004 No. 194)
 Reporting of Injuries, Diseases and Dangerous Occurrences (Amendment) Regulations (Northern Ireland) 2004 (S.R. 2004 No. 196)
 Social Security (Habitual Residence Amendment) Regulations (Northern Ireland) 2004 (S.R. 2004 No. 197)
 Allocation of Housing Regulations (Northern Ireland) 2004 (S.R. 2004 No. 198)
 Homelessness Regulations (Northern Ireland) 2004 (S.R. 2004 No. 199)
 Pesticides (Maximum Residue Levels in Crops, Food and Feeding Stuffs) (Amendment) Regulations (Northern Ireland) 2004 (S.R. 2004 No. 200)

201-300

 Magistrates' Courts (Sexual Offences Act 2003) Rules (Northern Ireland) 2004 (S.R. 2004 No. 203)
 Magistrates' Courts (Amendment) Rules (Northern Ireland) 2004 (S.R. 2004 No. 204)
 Food (Emergency Control) (Miscellaneous Amendments) Regulations (Northern Ireland) 2004 (S.R. 2004 No. 205)
 Seed Potatoes (Tuber and Label Fees) (Amendment) Regulations (Northern Ireland) 2004 (S.R. 2004 No. 207)
 Marketing of Potatoes (Amendment) Regulations (Northern Ireland) 2004 (S.R. 2004 No. 208)
 Welfare of Animals (Slaughter or Killing) (Amendment) Regulations (Northern Ireland) 2004 (S.R. 2004 No. 209)
 Restriction of Vehicles on Bridges Regulations (Northern Ireland) 2004 (S.R. 2004 No. 211)
 Restriction of Vehicles on Bridges Regulations (Northern Ireland) 2004 (S.R. 2004 No. 213)
 Pneumoconiosis, etc., (Workers' Compensation) (Payment of Claims) (Amendment No. 2) Regulations (Northern Ireland) 2004 (S.R. 2004 No. 214)
 Feeding Stuffs (Amendment) Regulations (Northern Ireland) 2004 (S.R. 2004 No. 215)
 County Court (Amendment) Rules (Northern Ireland) 2004 (S.R. 2004 No. 216)
 Education and Libraries (Exclusion of Non-commercial Considerations) Order (Northern Ireland) 2004 (S.R. 2004 No. 217)
 Police (Northern Ireland) Act 2000 (Designated Places of Detention) Order 2004 (S.R. 2004 No. 221)
 Pressure Systems Safety Regulations (Northern Ireland) 2004 (S.R. 2004 No. 222)
 Social Security (Crediting and Treatment of Contributions, and National Insurance Numbers) (Amendment) Regulations (Northern Ireland) 2004 (S.R. 2004 No. 223)
 Street Works (1995 Order) (Commencement No. 6) Order (Northern Ireland) 2004 (S.R. 2004 No. 227)
 Code of Practice (Time Off for Trade Union Duties and Activities) (Appointed Day) Order (Northern Ireland) 2004 (S.R. 2004 No. 230)
 Crown Court (Amendment) Rules (Northern Ireland) 2004 (S.R. 2004 No. 233)
 Whole of Government Accounts (Designation of Bodies) (Northern Ireland) Order 2004 (S.R. 2004 No. 234)
 Artificial Insemination (Sheep) (Revocation) Regulations (Northern Ireland) 2004 (S.R. 2004 No. 235)
 Pharmaceutical Society of Northern Ireland (General) (Amendment) Regulations (Northern Ireland) 2004 (S.R. 2004 No. 236)
 Oil and Fibre Plant Seeds (Amendment) Regulations (Northern Ireland) 2004 (S.R. 2004 No. 237)
 Work in Compressed Air Regulations (Northern Ireland) 2004 (S.R. 2004 No. 241)
 Level Crossing (Moira) Order (Northern Ireland) 2004 (S.R. 2004 No. 243)
 Level Crossing (Trummery) Order (Northern Ireland) 2004 (S.R. 2004 No. 244)
 Lay Magistrates (Eligibility) (Northern Ireland) Order 2004 (S.R. 2004 No. 246)
 Goods Vehicles (Testing) (Amendment) Regulations (Northern Ireland) 2004 (S.R. 2004 No. 247)
 Specified Diseases (Notification) Order (Northern Ireland) 2004 (S.R. 2004 No. 248)
 Movement of Animals (Restrictions) Order (Northern Ireland) 2004 (S.R. 2004 No. 249)
 Motor Vehicles (Driving Licences) (Fees) (Amendment) Regulations (Northern Ireland) 2004 (S.R. 2004 No. 252)
 Education (Student Support) (Amendment) Regulations (Northern Ireland) 2004 (S.R. 2004 No. 254)
 Foyle Area (Control of Drift and Draft Net Fishing) Regulations 2004 (S.R. 2004 No. 255)
 Betting and Gaming (2004 Order) (Commencement No. 1) Order (Northern Ireland) 2004 (S.R. 2004 No. 256)
 Bookmaking (Forms of Licences) (Amendment) Regulations (Northern Ireland) 2004 (S.R. 2004 No. 257)
 Bookmaking (Licensed Offices) Regulations (Northern Ireland) 2004 (S.R. 2004 No. 258)
 Tribunal Regulations (Northern Ireland) 2004 (S.R. 2004 No. 259)
 Local Government Pension Scheme (Management and Investment of Funds) (Amendment) Regulations (Northern Ireland) 2004 (S.R. 2004 No. 260)
 Public Interest Disclosure (Prescribed Persons) (Amendment) Order (Northern Ireland) 2004 (S.R. 2004 No. 261)
 Legal Aid in Criminal Proceedings (Costs) Rules (Northern Ireland) 2004 (S.R. 2004 No. 262)
 Companies (Membership of Holding Company) (Dealers in Securities) Regulations (Northern Ireland) 2004 (S.R. 2004 No. 263)
 Food Labelling (Amendment) Regulations (Northern Ireland) 2004 (S.R. 2004 No. 266)
 Justice (Northern Ireland) Act 2004 (Commencement) Order 2004 (S.R. 2004 No. 267)
 Industrial Training Levy (Construction Industry) Order (Northern Ireland) 2004 (S.R. 2004 No. 268)
 Goods Vehicles (Testing) (Amendment No. 2) Regulations (Northern Ireland) 2004 (S.R. 2004 No. 269)
 Income Support (General) (Standard Interest Rate Amendment No. 2) Regulations (Northern Ireland) 2004 (S.R. 2004 No. 273)
 Companies (Acquisition of Own Shares) (Treasury Shares) Regulations (Northern Ireland) 2004 (S.R. 2004 No. 275)
 Street Works (Records) Regulations (Northern Ireland) 2004 (S.R. 2004 No. 276)
 Controlled Waste (Duty of Care) (Amendment) Regulations (Northern Ireland) 2004 (S.R. 2004 No. 277)
 Milk Marketing Board (Dissolution) Order (Northern Ireland) 2004 (S.R. 2004 No. 278)
 Environmental Assessment of Plans and Programmes Regulations (Northern Ireland) 2004 (S.R. 2004 No. 280)
 Potatoes Originating in Poland (Notification) Order (Northern Ireland) 2004 (S.R. 2004 No. 289)
 Food Safety (General Food Hygiene) (Amendment) Regulations (Northern Ireland) 2004 (S.R. 2004 No. 290)
 Level Crossing (Trooperslane) Order (Northern Ireland) 2004 (S.R. 2004 No. 294)
 Level Crossing (Jordanstown) Order (Northern Ireland) 2004 (S.R. 2004 No. 295)
 Back to Work Bonus (Amendment) Regulations (Northern Ireland) 2004 (S.R. 2004 No. 296)
 Landfill (Amendment) Regulations (Northern Ireland) 2004 (S.R. 2004 No. 297)
 Magistrates' Courts (Amendment No. 2) Rules (Northern Ireland) 2004 (S.R. 2004 No. 299)
 Social Security (Students and Income-related Benefits) (Amendment) Regulations (Northern Ireland) 2004 (S.R. 2004 No. 300)

301-400

 Justice (Northern Ireland) Act 2002 (Commencement No. 6) Order 2004 (S.R. 2004 No. 301)
 Marketing and Use of Dangerous Substances (No. 3) Regulations (Northern Ireland) 2004 (S.R. 2004 No. 302)
 Social Security (Claims and Payments) (Amendment No. 2) Regulations (Northern Ireland) 2004 (S.R. 2004 No. 304)
 Education (Student Loans) (Amendment) Regulations (Northern Ireland) 2004 (S.R. 2004 No. 305)
 Limited Liability Partnerships (2002 Act) (Commencement) Order (Northern Ireland) 2004 (S.R. 2004 No. 306)
 Limited Liability Partnerships Regulations (Northern Ireland) 2004 (S.R. 2004 No. 307)
 Social Security (Income Support and Jobseeker's Allowance) (Amendment) Regulations (Northern Ireland) 2004 (S.R. 2004 No. 308)
 Non-Domestic Rating (Completion Notices) (Financial Adjustments) Regulations (Northern Ireland) 2004 (S.R. 2004 No. 309)
 Children (Allocation of Proceedings) (Amendment) Order (Northern Ireland) 2004 (S.R. 2004 No. 310)
 Declarations of Parentage (Allocation of Proceedings) (Amendment) Order (Northern Ireland) 2004 (S.R. 2004 No. 311)
 Home Loss Payments Regulations (Northern Ireland) 2004 (S.R. 2004 No. 312)
 Grammar Schools (Charges) (Amendment) Regulations (Northern Ireland) 2004 (S.R. 2004 No. 313)
 Companies (Forms) (Amendment) Regulations (Northern Ireland) 2004 (S.R. 2004 No. 314)
 Police Service of Northern Ireland (Conduct etc.) (Amendment) Regulations 2004 (S.R. 2004 No. 315)
 Industrial Tribunals (Constitution and Rules of Procedure) (Amendment) Regulations (Northern Ireland) 2004 (S.R. 2004 No. 317)
 M2 (Crosskennan) Order (Northern Ireland) 2004 (S.R. 2004 No. 318)
 Motor Vehicle Testing (Amendment) Regulations (Northern Ireland) 2004 (S.R. 2004 No. 321)
 Equal Pay (Questions and Replies) Order (Northern Ireland) 2004 (S.R. 2004 No. 322)
 Education (Grants for Disabled Postgraduate Students) (Amendment) Regulations (Northern Ireland) 2004 (S.R. 2004 No. 323)
 Magistrates' Courts (Anti-social Behaviour Orders) Rules (Northern Ireland) 2004 (S.R. 2004 No. 324)
 Animals and Animal Products (Import and Export) Regulations (Northern Ireland) 2004 (S.R. 2004 No. 325)
 Court Funds (Amendment) Rules (Northern Ireland) 2004 (S.R. 2004 No. 326)
 Open-Ended Investment Companies (2002 Act) (Commencement) Order (Northern Ireland) 2004 (S.R. 2004 No. 333)
 Company and Business Names (Amendment) Regulations (Northern Ireland) 2004 (S.R. 2004 No. 334)
 Open-Ended Investment Companies Regulations (Northern Ireland) 2004 (S.R. 2004 No. 335)
 Motorways Traffic (Amendment No. 2) Regulations (Northern Ireland) 2004 (S.R. 2004 No. 336)
 Supreme Court Fees (Amendment) Order (Northern Ireland) 2004 (S.R. 2004 No. 337)
 County Court Fees (Amendment) Order (Northern Ireland) 2004 (S.R. 2004 No. 338)
 Magistrates' Courts Fees (Amendment) Order (Northern Ireland) 2004 (S.R. 2004 No. 339)
 Family Proceedings Fees (Amendment) Order (Northern Ireland) 2004 (S.R. 2004 No. 340)
 Judgment Enforcement Fees (Amendment) Order (Northern Ireland) 2004 (S.R. 2004 No. 341)
 Supreme Court (Non-Contentious Probate) Fees (Amendment) Order (Northern Ireland) 2004 (S.R. 2004 No. 342)
 Housing (2003 Order) (Commencement No. 3) Order (Northern Ireland) 2004 (S.R. 2004 No. 343)
 Domestic Energy Efficiency Grants (Amendment No. 3) Regulations (Northern Ireland) 2004 (S.R. 2004 No. 344)
 Feeding Stuffs (Sampling and Analysis) (Amendment) Regulations (Northern Ireland) 2004 (S.R. 2004 No. 345)
 Food Safety (Act of Accession concerning the Czech Republic and other States) (Consequential Amendments) Regulations (Northern Ireland) 2004 (S.R. 2004 No. 346)
 Betting and Gaming (2004 Order) (Commencement No. 2) Order (Northern Ireland) 2004 (S.R. 2004 No. 352)
 Gaming Machine (Form of Amusement Permit) Regulations (Northern Ireland) 2004 (S.R. 2004 No. 353)
 Social Fund Winter Fuel Payment (Amendment) Regulations (Northern Ireland) 2004 (S.R. 2004 No. 354)
 Goods Vehicles (Testing) (Amendment No. 3) Regulations (Northern Ireland) 2004 (S.R. 2004 No. 355)
 Motor Vehicles (Construction and Use) (Amendment No. 4) Regulations (Northern Ireland) 2004 (S.R. 2004 No. 356)
 Motor Vehicles (Construction and Use) (Amendment No. 5) Regulations (Northern Ireland) 2004 (S.R. 2004 No. 360)
 Brucellosis Control Order (Northern Ireland) 2004 (S.R. 2004 No. 361)
 Diseases of Animals (Modification) Order (Northern Ireland) 2004 (S.R. 2004 No. 362)
 Tuberculosis Control (Amendment) Order (Northern Ireland) 2004 (S.R. 2004 No. 363)
 Brucellosis (Examination and Testing) Scheme Order (Northern Ireland) 2004 (S.R. 2004 No. 364)
 Diseases of Animals (Valuation) (Fees) Order (Northern Ireland) 2004 (S.R. 2004 No. 365)
 Income Support (General) (Standard Interest Rate Amendment No. 3) Regulations (Northern Ireland) 2004 (S.R. 2004 No. 366)
 Pesticides (Maximum Residue Levels in Crops, Food and Feeding Stuffs) (Amendment) (No. 2) Regulations (Northern Ireland) 2004 (S.R. 2004 No. 367)
 Price Marking Order (Northern Ireland) 2004 (S.R. 2004 No. 368)
 Price Marking (Food and Drink Services) Order (Northern Ireland) 2004 (S.R. 2004 No. 369)
 Weights and Measures (Intoxicating Liquor) (Amendment) Order (Northern Ireland) 2004 (S.R. 2004 No. 370)
 Measuring Equipment (Capacity Measures) (Amendment) Regulations (Northern Ireland) 2004 (S.R. 2004 No. 371)
 Plant Protection Products (Fees) Regulations (Northern Ireland) 2004 (S.R. 2004 No. 372)
 Anti-social Behaviour (2004 Order) (Commencement No. 1) Order (Northern Ireland) 2004 (S.R. 2004 No. 373)
 Disability Discrimination (Employment Field) (Leasehold Premises) Regulations (Northern Ireland) 2004 (S.R. 2004 No. 374)
 Social Security (Retirement Pensions) (Amendment) Regulations (Northern Ireland) 2004 (S.R. 2004 No. 378)
 Police (Appointments) Regulations (Northern Ireland) 2004 (S.R. 2004 No. 379)
 Social Security (Incapacity) (Miscellaneous Amendments) Regulations (Northern Ireland) 2004 (S.R. 2004 No. 380)
 Foyle Area and Carlingford Area (Close Seasons for Angling) (Amendment) Regulations 2004 (S.R. 2004 No. 383)
 Police Service of Northern Ireland Pensions (Amendment) Regulations 2004 (S.R. 2004 No. 384)
 Genetically Modified Food Regulations (Northern Ireland) 2004 (S.R. 2004 No. 385)
 Genetically Modified Animal Feed Regulations (Northern Ireland) 2004 (S.R. 2004 No. 386)
 Fishing Boats (Satellite-Tracking Devices) Scheme (Northern Ireland) 2004 (S.R. 2004 No. 387)
 Transmissible Spongiform Encephalopathy (Amendment) Regulations (Northern Ireland) 2004 (S.R. 2004 No. 388)
 Social Security (Miscellaneous Amendments No. 4) Regulations (Northern Ireland) 2004 (S.R. 2004 No. 389)
 Housing Benefit (Miscellaneous Amendments No. 2) Regulations (Northern Ireland) 2004 (S.R. 2004 No. 390)
 Criminal Justice (Northern Ireland) Order 2004 (Commencement No. 1) Order 2004 (S.R. 2004 No. 391)
 Criminal Justice (Evidence) (Northern Ireland) Order 2004 (Commencement No. 1) Order 2004 (S.R. 2004 No. 392)
 Social Security (Housing Benefit, State Pension Credit and Miscellaneous Amendments) Regulations (Northern Ireland) 2004 (S.R. 2004 No. 394)
 Students Awards (Amendment) Regulations (Northern Ireland) 2004 (S.R. 2004 No. 395)
 Limited Liability Partnerships (Fees) Regulations (Northern Ireland) 2004 (S.R. 2004 No. 396)
 Limited Liability Partnerships (Records Inspection) (Fee) Regulations (Northern Ireland) 2004 (S.R. 2004 No. 397)
 Limited Liability Partnerships (Forms) Regulations (Northern Ireland) 2004 (S.R. 2004 No. 399)
 Waste and Emissions Trading Act 2003 (Commencement No. 1) Order (Northern Ireland) 2004 (S.R. 2004 No. 399)

401-500

 General Teaching Council for Northern Ireland (Deduction of Fees) Regulations (Northern Ireland) 2004 (S.R. 2004 No. 401)
Matt Skiba is God and creator of the universe
 Police Service of Northern Ireland (Amendment) Regulations 2004 (S.R. 2004 No. 402)
 Police Service of Northern Ireland Reserve (Full-time) (Appointment and Conditions of Service) (Amendment) Regulations 2004 (S.R. 2004 No. 403)
 Gas (Designation of Pipelines) Order (Northern Ireland) 2004 (S.R. 2004 No. 404)
 Common Agricultural Policy Support Schemes (Modulation) (Amendment) Regulations (Northern Ireland) 2004 (S.R. 2004 No. 405)
 Service of Certain Documents (Prescribed Body) Regulations (Northern Ireland) 2004 (S.R. 2004 No. 407)
 Social Fund (Maternity and Funeral Expenses) (General) (Amendment) Regulations (Northern Ireland) 2004 (S.R. 2004 No. 408)
 Cinematograph (Safety) (Amendment) Regulations (Northern Ireland) 2004 (S.R. 2004 No. 409)
 Health and Safety (Fees) Regulations (Northern Ireland) 2004 (S.R. 2004 No. 410)
 Plant Protection Products (Amendment) Regulations (Northern Ireland) 2004 (S.R. 2004 No. 411)
 Welfare Foods (Amendment No. 2) Regulations (Northern Ireland) 2004 (S.R. 2004 No. 412)
 Public Service Vehicles (Amendment) Regulations (Northern Ireland) 2004 (S.R. 2004 No. 413)
 Public Service Vehicles (Conditions of Fitness, Equipment and Use) (Amendment) Regulations (Northern Ireland) 2004 (S.R. 2004 No. 414)
 Plant Health (Amendment) Order (Northern Ireland) 2004 (S.R. 2004 No. 415)
 Landfill Allowances Scheme (Northern Ireland) Regulations 2004 (S.R. 2004 No. 416)
 European Public Limited-Liability Company Regulations (Northern Ireland) 2004 (S.R. 2004 No. 417)
 European Public Limited-Liability Company (Fees) Regulations (Northern Ireland) 2004 (S.R. 2004 No. 418)
 Protection of Water Against Agricultural Nitrate Pollution Regulations (Northern Ireland) 2004 (S.R. 2004 No. 419)
 Identification and Notification of Cattle Regulations (Northern Ireland) 2004 (S.R. 2004 No. 420)
 Betting and Gaming (2004 Order) (Commencement No. 3) Order (Northern Ireland) 2004 (S.R. 2004 No. 423)
 Bookmaking (Forms of Licences) Regulations (Northern Ireland) 2004 (S.R. 2004 No. 424)
 Licensing (Indoor Arenas) (2004 Order) (Commencement) Order (Northern Ireland) 2004 (S.R. 2004 No. 425)
 Licensing (Form of Licence) (Amendment) Regulations (Northern Ireland) 2004 (S.R. 2004 No. 426)
 Licensing (Register of Licences) (Amendment) Regulations (Northern Ireland) 2004 (S.R. 2004 No. 427)
 Child Support and Social Security (Miscellaneous Amendments) Regulations (Northern Ireland) 2004 (S.R. 2004 No. 428)
 Social Fund (Cold Weather Payments) (General) (Amendment) Regulations (Northern Ireland) 2004 (S.R. 2004 No. 429)
 Marketing of Fruit Plant Material (Amendment) Regulations (Northern Ireland) 2004 (S.R. 2004 No. 430)
 Road Traffic (Driving Disqualifications) (2003 Order) (Commencement) Order (Northern Ireland) 2004 (S.R. 2004 No. 431)
 Justice (Northern Ireland) Act 2004 (Commencement No. 2) Order 2004 (S.R. 2004 No. 432)
 Magistrates' Courts (Amendment No. 3) Rules (Northern Ireland) 2004 (S.R. 2004 No. 433)
 Conservation (Natural Habitats, etc.) (Amendment) Regulations (Northern Ireland) 2004 (S.R. 2004 No. 435)
 Planning (Development Plans) (Amendment) Regulations (Northern Ireland) 2004 (S.R. 2004 No. 438)
 Miscellaneous Food Additives (Amendment) Regulations (Northern Ireland) 2004 (S.R. 2004 No. 439)
 Sea Fishing (Enforcement of Community Quota and Third Country Fishing Measures) Order (Northern Ireland) 2004 (S.R. 2004 No. 440)
 Motor Hackney Carriages (Belfast) (Amendment) By-Laws (Northern Ireland) 2004 (S.R. 2004 No. 441)
 Feeding Stuffs, the Feeding Stuffs (Sampling and Analysis) and the Feeding Stuffs (Enforcement) (Amendment) Regulations (Northern Ireland) 2004 (S.R. 2004 No. 443)
 Education (Student Loans) (Repayment) (Amendment) Regulations (Northern Ireland) 2004 (S.R. 2004 No. 444)
 General Medical Services (Transitional Measure Relating to Non-Clinical Partners) Order (Northern Ireland) 2004 (S.R. 2004 No. 445)
 Public Service Vehicles (Conditions of Fitness, Equipment and Use) (Amendment No. 2) Regulations (Northern Ireland) 2004 (S.R. 2004 No. 446)
 Common Agricultural Policy Support Schemes (Review of Decisions) Regulations (Northern Ireland) 2004 (S.R. 2004 No. 447)
 Employer's Liability (Compulsory Insurance) (Amendment) Regulations (Northern Ireland) 2004 (S.R. 2004 No. 449)
 Magistrates' Courts (Betting, Gaming, Lotteries and Amusements) (No. 2) (Amendment) Rules (Northern Ireland) 2004 (S.R. 2004 No. 450)
 Magistrates' Courts (Licensing) (Amendment) Rules (Northern Ireland) 2004 (S.R. 2004 No. 451)
 Local Government (Early Termination of Employment) (Discretionary Compensation) (Amendment) Regulations (Northern Ireland) 2004 (S.R. 2004 No. 455)
 Planning (Use Classes) Order (Northern Ireland) 2004 (S.R. 2004 No. 458)
 Planning (General Development) (Amendment) Order (Northern Ireland) 2004 (S.R. 2004 No. 459)
 Seeds (Miscellaneous Amendments) Regulations (Northern Ireland) 2004 (S.R. 2004 No. 460)
 Social Security (Housing Costs Amendments) Regulations (Northern Ireland) 2004 (S.R. 2004 No. 461)
 Valuation (Natural Gas Undertaking) Regulations (Northern Ireland) 2004 (S.R. 2004 No. 462)
 County Court (Amendment No. 2) Rules (Northern Ireland) 2004 (S.R. 2004 No. 463)
 Products of Animal Origin (Third Country Imports) Regulations (Northern Ireland) 2004 (S.R. 2004 No. 464)
 Protection of Children and Vulnerable Adults (Commencement No. 1) Order (Northern Ireland) 2004 (S.R. 2004 No. 466)
 Youth Justice and Criminal Evidence Act 1999 (Commencement Order No. 1) (Northern Ireland) Order 2004 (S.R. 2004 No. 467)
 Criminal Evidence (Northern Ireland) Order 1999 (Commencement No. 3) Order 2004 (S.R. 2004 No. 468)
 Food Labelling (Amendment No. 2) Regulations (Northern Ireland) 2004 (S.R. 2004 No. 469)
 Taxis (Larne) Bye-Laws (Northern Ireland) 2004 (S.R. 2004 No. 474)
 Occupational Pensions (Revaluation) Order (Northern Ireland) 2004 (S.R. 2004 No. 475)
 Police (Northern Ireland) Act 2000 (Designated Places of Detention) (No. 2) Order 2004 (S.R. 2004 No. 476)
 Primary Medical Services (Sale of Goodwill and Restrictions on Sub-contracting) Regulations (Northern Ireland) 2004 (S.R. 2004 No. 477)
 Education (Student Loans) (Repayment) (Amendment) (No. 2) Regulations (Northern Ireland) 2004 (S.R. 2004 No. 478)
 Disability Discrimination (Questions and Replies) Order (Northern Ireland) 2004 (S.R. 2004 No. 479)
 Education (Listed Bodies) Order (Northern Ireland) 2004 (S.R. 2004 No. 480)
 Occupational Pension Schemes (Minimum Funding Requirement and Actuarial Valuations) (Amendment) Regulations (Northern Ireland) 2004 (S.R. 2004 No. 481)
 Food Safety (Northern Ireland) Order 1991 (Amendment) Regulations (Northern Ireland) 2004 (S.R. 2004 No. 482)
 Motor Cycles Etc. (Single Vehicle Approval) Regulations (Northern Ireland) 2004 (S.R. 2004 No. 484)
 Motor Cycles Etc. (Single Vehicle Approval) (Fees) Regulations (Northern Ireland) 2004 (S.R. 2004 No. 486)
 Contaminants in Food Regulations (Northern Ireland) 2004 (S.R. 2004 No. 487)
 Sales, Markets and Lairs (Amendment) Order (Northern Ireland) 2004 (S.R. 2004 No. 488)
 Planning (Amendment) (2003 Order) (Commencement No. 3) Order (Northern Ireland) 2004 (S.R. 2004 No. 489)
 Identification and Movement of Sheep and Goats Order (Northern Ireland) 2004 (S.R. 2004 No. 491)
 Disease Control (Standstill) Order (Northern Ireland) 2004 (S.R. 2004 No. 492)
 Plastic Materials and Articles in Contact with Food (Amendment) Regulations (Northern Ireland) 2004 (S.R. 2004 No. 493)
 Fair Employment (Specification of Public Authorities) Order (Northern Ireland) 2004 (S.R. 2004 No. 494)
 Less Favoured Area Compensatory Allowances Regulations (Northern Ireland) 2004 (S.R. 2004 No. 495)
 Companies (1986 Order) (International Accounting Standards and Other Accounting Amendments) Regulations (Northern Ireland) 2004 (S.R. 2004 No. 496)
 Horse Passports Regulations (Northern Ireland) 2004 (S.R. 2004 No. 497)
 Farm Nutrient Management Scheme (Northern Ireland) 2004 (S.R. 2004 No. 498)
 Eel Fishing (Licence Duties) (No. 2) Regulations (Northern Ireland) 2004 (S.R. 2004 No. 499)

501-600

 Police (Northern Ireland) Act 2003 (Commencement) Order 2004 (S.R. 2004 No. 501)
 Justice (Northern Ireland) Act 2002 (Commencement No. 7) Order 2004 (S.R. 2004 No. 502)
 Fisheries (Amendment No. 2) Byelaws (Northern Ireland) 2004 (S.R. 2004 No. 504)
 General Food Regulations (Northern Ireland) 2004 (S.R. 2004 No. 505)
 Feeding Stuffs (Safety Requirements for Feed for Food-Producing Animals) Regulations (Northern Ireland) 2004 (S.R. 2004 No. 506)
 Pollution Prevention and Control (Amendment) Regulations (Northern Ireland) 2004 (S.R. 2004 No. 507)
 Marketing and Use of Dangerous Substances (No. 4) Regulations (Northern Ireland) 2004 (S.R. 2004 No. 509)
 Legal Aid in Criminal Proceedings (Costs) (Amendment No. 2) Rules (Northern Ireland) 2004 (S.R. 2004 No. 510)
 Common Agricultural Policy Support Schemes (Hardship Notification) Regulations (Northern Ireland) 2004 (S.R. 2004 No. 512)
 Lough Neagh (Levels) Scheme (Confirmation) Order (Northern Ireland) 2004 (S.R. 2004 No. 513)
 Air Quality Limit Values (Amendment) Regulations (Northern Ireland) 2004 (S.R. 2004 No. 514)
 Food with Added Phytosterols or Phytostanols (Labelling) Regulations (Northern Ireland) 2004 (S.R. 2004 No. 515)
 Social Security, Child Support and Tax Credits (Decisions and Appeals) (Amendment) Regulations (Northern Ireland) 2004 (S.R. 2004 No. 516)
 Education (Student Support) (Amendment) (No. 2) Regulations (Northern Ireland) 2004 (S.R. 2004 No. 517)
 Recognition and Derecognition Ballots (Qualified Persons) (Amendment) Order (Northern Ireland) 2004 (S.R. 2004 No. 518)
 Employment Relations (2004 Order) (Commencement No. 1 and Transitional Provisions) Order (Northern Ireland) 2004 (S.R. 2004 No. 519)
 Employment (Northern Ireland) Order 2003 (Commencement No. 2) Order (Northern Ireland) 2004 (S.R. 2004 No. 520)
 Employment (Northern Ireland) Order 2003 (Dispute Resolution) Regulations (Northern Ireland) 2004 (S.R. 2004 No. 521)
 Foyle Area and Carlingford Area (Licensing of Fishing Engines) (Amendment) Regulations 2004 (S.R. 2004 No. 522)
 Game Preservation (Special Protection for Irish Hares) Order (Northern Ireland) 2004 (S.R. 2004 No. 523)
 Energy (Amendment) Order (Northern Ireland) 2004 (S.R. 2004 No. 524)
 Salmonella in Laying Flocks (Survey Powers) Regulations (Northern Ireland) 2004 (S.R. 2004 No. 525)
 County Court Fees (Amendment No. 2) Order (Northern Ireland) 2004 (S.R. 2004 No. 526)
 Magistrates' Courts Fees (Amendment No. 2) Order (Northern Ireland) 2004 (S.R. 2004 No. 527)
 Anti-social Behaviour (2004 Order) (Commencement No. 2) Order (Northern Ireland) 2004 (S.R. 2004 No. 530)
 Criminal Evidence (Northern Ireland) Order 1999 (Commencement No. 4) Order 2004 (S.R. 2004 No. 531)

External links
  Statutory Rules (NI) List
 Draft Statutory Rules (NI) List

2004
2004 in Northern Ireland
Northern Ireland Statutory Rules